Douglas Murray (born November 1947) is an American comic book writer and novelist. He served as a non-commissioned officer in the Army in Vietnam during the Vietnam War. He worked as a writer for The Monster Times newspaper in the early 1970s, and later as a Marvel Comics writer from 1984 to 1991. He was the main writer on the popular 1980s comic book series The 'Nam, published by Marvel.  

In the 1970s, Murray edited Heritage (a 2-issue fanzine dedicated to Flash Gordon), The Neal Adams Index (1974) and two separate ACBA Sketchbook publications (in 1973 and 1975 respectively). 

Born and raised in New York, Doug grew up on Long Island in Lindenhurst, New York. He was always a mega-collector of science fiction books, pulps, monster magazines and all sorts of movie memorabilia. He moved to Florida in 1990 and resides there today with his wife Pam (married since November 1979).

Bibliography
 The Monster Times various articles in numerous issues (early to mid-1970s)
 Heritage 1-A and 1-B (2-issue Flash Gordon fan publication) (1972) publisher/ editor
 ACBA Sketchbook (1973) publisher
 Neal Adams Index (1974) publisher
 ACBA Sketchbook 2 (1975) publisher
 Two The Destroyer paperback novels (connected plotwise) (circa 1975)
 Reel Fantasy Magazine # 1 (1978)
 Savage Tales Magazine Vol. 2, #1 and #4 (1984) each contained a "Nam" prototype story by Doug Murray
 The 'Nam #1-45, 49–51, 75 (Dec. 1986 - Dec. 1990)
 Mark Hazzard: Merc #5-12 (Mar. 1987 - Oct. 1987)
 Mark Hazzard: Merc Annual #1 (Jan. 1987)
 Justice Machine #14-26 (Comico, Feb. 1988–Feb. 1989)
 Hearts and Minds: A Vietnam Love Story, illustrated by Russ Heath; Epic Comics (1990)
 The War #1-4 (June 1989 - Mar. 1990)
 Savage Sword of Conan #171, 182 (Mar. 1990 - Feb. 1991)
 What If? vol. 2 #10 (Feb. 1990)
 Sherlock Holmes and the Case of the Missing Martian (1990)
 Marvel Comics Presents #77-79 (1991)
 Nick Fury, Agent of S.H.I.E.L.D. vol. 3 #24 (June 1991)
 Medal of Honor Special (April 1994)
 Medal of Honor #1-4 (Oct. 2004 - Jan. 2005)
 Savage Red Sonja: Queen of the Frozen Wastes #1-4 (Aug. 2006 - Oct. 2006)
 Jungle Girl #3 (Nov. 2007)
 Jungle Girl Season 2 #1-5 (Nov. 2008 - July 2009)
 Athena #1-4 (Sept. 2009 - Mar. 2010)

References

External links
 
 
 Interview with Doug Murray - Slushfactory

1947 births
Living people
American comics writers
United States Army personnel of the Vietnam War
United States Army soldiers